Dynastaspis is a genus of mites in the family Laelapidae.

Species
 Dynastaspis walhallae Costa, 1971

References

Laelapidae